West Deep Creek also known as Round Valley Creek, Spring Creek and West Creek is a tributary stream with its head at the confluence of Spring Creek and an unnamed stream, in White Pine County, Nevada, and its mouth in Tooele County, Utah at its confluence with East Deep Creek that forms the head of Deep Creek. 

It flows northeastward into Utah to join East Deep Creek to form the head of Deep Creek, 0.96 km (0.6 mi) southwest of Ibapah, Utah.

References 

Rivers of White Pine County, Nevada
Rivers of Tooele County, Utah